The 304th Sustainment Brigade is a sustainment brigade of the United States Army Reserve. It is headquartered at March Air Reserve Base near Riverside, California.

Originally the 304th Corps Materiel Management Center, the unit became the 304th Support Center and received a distinctive unit insignia in August 2005. It then was transformed into a Sustainment Brigade in February 2006, and received its shoulder sleeve insignia in March 2006.

Subordinate Units 
The brigade is made up of the following units:
 304th Headquarters and Headquarters Company
 155th Technical Manager Petrol (Quality Assurance) 
 304th Special Troops Battalion 
 380th Detachment (Theater Operations Element) 
 397th Company (Network Support) 
 387th Company (Network Support)
 155th Combat Sustainment Support Battalion (CSSB)
 155th Headquarters and Headquarters Company
 693rd Quartermaster Company
 555th Transportation Detachment (Movement Control Team)(Area) 
 137th Quartermaster Company (Field Services)(Mission Operations Directorate)
 387th Quartermaster Company
 250th Transportation Company (Medium Truck)(Cargo)(Echelons above corps) 
 250th Quartermaster Company (Water Support)
 371st Combat Sustainment Support Battalion (CSSB)
 371st Headquarters and Headquarters Company
 63d PR CO (HR)
 304th Transportation (Movement Control Team)
 376th Adjutant General Company
 329th Quartermaster Company
 606th Quartermaster Detachment (Petrol Liaison) 
 397th Signal Company
 950th Ordinance Company
 806th Detachment (Military Mail Terminal) 
 880th Field Feeding Company
 420th Transportation Battalion
 420th Headquarters and Headquarters Company
 211th Transportation Company
 380th Theater Movement Control Element
 570th Transportation Company (Movement Control Team)
 566th Movement Control Team
 650th Movement Control Team
 730th Transportation Company
 975th TC TM MOV

Operation Iraqi Freedom
The Brigade deployed to support Operation Iraqi Freedom in late 2008.  The brigade relieved the 55th Sustainment Brigade and supported Multi-National Division North and Baghdad.

Operation Enduring Freedom/Operation Inherent Resolve
in January, 2020, the 304th Brigade Headquarters, Headquarters Company and Special Troops Battalion were activated and deployed to Camp Arifjan Kuwait in support of logistical Operations throughout the Southwest Asia area of operations. The 304th SB replaced the 77th SB during the COVID pandemic while supporting operations in Kuwait, Iraq, Afghanistan, Jordan Syria Saudi Arabia, UAE, and Qatar. The Unit fell in under the 311th ESC and the 1st TSC while in Kuwait.

References

External links
March Air Reserve Base News Article
The Institute of Heraldry: 304th Sustainment Brigade
US Army Reserve Organization Page

304
Military units and formations established in 2006